Wath TMD was a motive power depot located in Wath upon Dearne, South Yorkshire, England. The depot was located near Wath station.

The depot code is WH.

History 
From 1963 to 1982, Class 08 shunters, Class 20, Class 25, Class 30, Class 31, Class 37, Class 40, Class 47 and 56, and Class 76 locomotives could be seen at the depot.

References 

Railway depots in Yorkshire
Wath upon Dearne
Woodhead Line